Andrew Parkinson is a retired American soccer forward born in South Africa who spent time playing in both South Africa and England before immigrating to the U.S. where he played five seasons in the North American Soccer League, two in Major Indoor Soccer League and one in the American Soccer League.  Parkinson earned two caps with the U.S. national team in 1984.

Early career
Parkinson, a native of Johannesburg, South Africa played for Highlands Park in his native South Africa.  In March 1978, Parkinson moved to England where he tried out with English First Division club Newcastle United.  He signed with Newcastle United at 18 years of age and played two seasons in the English First Division.  He then moved to lower-division club Peterborough United where he played 13 games, scoring 5 goals in the 1979-1980 season. Andrew Parkinson was sold to the Philadelphia Fury of the North American Soccer League during the 1979/80 season.

Move to U.S.
In 1980, Parkinson then moved to the United States where he signed with the Philadelphia Fury of the North American Soccer League (NASL).  Once again, he played a single season before the Fury was relocated to Montreal becoming the Montreal Manic.  Parkinson had a successful two seasons with the Montreal Manic scoring the first two goals for the new franchise in the first game of the season winning 2 - 1 against the Toronto Blizzard and leading them to the playoffs and was one of the leading goal scorers once again.  During this time, Parkinson received his U.S. citizenship.  In 1983, the U.S. Soccer Federation, in coordination with the NASL, entered the U.S. national team, known as Team America, into the NASL as a league franchise.  The team drew on U.S. citizens playing in the NASL, Major Indoor Soccer League and American Soccer League.  Parkinson left the Manic and played a couple of indoor matches for Fort Lauderdale in the 1983 Grand Prix before signing with Team America.  When Team America finished the 1983 season in the struggling NASL the team disbanded with Parkinson being the leading goal scorer with 12 goals.  The New York Cosmos acquired Parkinson when Team America disbanded and he played for the Cosmos during the 1983–84 NASL indoor season and the 1984 outdoor season.  At the end of the season, the NASL collapsed and the Cosmos jumped to the Major Indoor Soccer League.  He began the MISL season with the Cosmos, but moved to the Chicago Sting in March 1985.  In the fall of 1985, Parkinson signed with the Tacoma Stars of the MISL during the 1985-1986 season.  In 1988, Parkinson played a single season with the Fort Lauderdale Strikers of the American Soccer League.

National team
In 1984, Parkinson earned his two caps with the U.S. national team.

References

External links
 Newcastle fan info on Parkinson
 NASL stats

1959 births
Living people
American Soccer League (1988–89) players
American soccer players
South African people of British descent
Chicago Sting (MISL) players
Expatriate footballers in England
Expatriate soccer players in Canada
Expatriate soccer players in the United States
Association football forwards
Fort Lauderdale Strikers (1977–1983) players
Fort Lauderdale Strikers (1988–1994) players
Major Indoor Soccer League (1978–1992) players
Montreal Manic players
Newcastle United F.C. players
New York Cosmos players
North American Soccer League (1968–1984) players
North American Soccer League (1968–1984) indoor players
Soccer players from Johannesburg
Peterborough United F.C. players
Philadelphia Fury (1978–1980) players
South African expatriate soccer players
South African expatriate sportspeople in Canada
South African emigrants to the United States
South African soccer players
White South African people
Tacoma Stars players
Team America (NASL) players
English Football League players
United States men's international soccer players